Arvika Municipality (Arvika kommun) is a municipality in Värmland County in west central Sweden. Its seat is located in the city of Arvika.

The present municipality was created in 1971 when the former City of Arvika was amalgamated with five rural municipalities of Glava, Gunnarskog, Älgå, Brunskog and Stavnäs.

Arvika is most known for the annual Arvika Festival that attracts international artists.

Localities
Arvika (seat)
Edane
Glava
Gunnarskog
Jössefors
Klässbol
Sulvik
Åmotfors (partly)

Notable natives
Kenny Bräck, racing driver
Per Eklund, rally and rallycross driver
Tommy Kristoffersson, rallycross and racing driver
Håkan Hagegård, opera singer
Kjellaug Nordsjö, icon painter
August Warberg, actor
Jacob de la Rose, ice hockey player

Politics
Result of the 2018 municipality election (loss or gain from 2014 elections):
Moderate Party 18.36%  (+3.35%)	
Centre Party 12.46%  (+2.02%)
Liberals 3.37%  (−1.04%)	
Christian Democrats 2.84%  (+0.92%)	
Swedish Social Democratic Party 39.18%  (−7.53%)	
Left Party 6.75%  (−0.35%)
Green Party 3.05%  (−2.32%)
Sweden Democrats 11.95%  (+3.38%)
Feminist Initiative 1.87  (+1.66%)
Other parties 0.16%  (−0.08%)

References

External links

Arvika Municipality – Official site
Arvika Festival – Official site

Municipalities of Värmland County
iu:ᐊᕐᕕᑲ